Hanoverdale is an unincorporated community in West Hanover Township, Dauphin County, Pennsylvania, United States, and is part of the Harrisburg-Carlisle Metropolitan Statistical Area.

Hanoverdale is located southeast of Skyline View at the intersection of Hershey Road and Devonshire Heights Road.

References

External links 
Hanoverdale Profile

Harrisburg–Carlisle metropolitan statistical area
Unincorporated communities in Dauphin County, Pennsylvania
Unincorporated communities in Pennsylvania